Belfast South by-election, 1917 may refer to:
 April 1917 Belfast South by-election
 July 1917 Belfast South by-election